The 1976 Boise State Broncos football team represented Boise State University in the 1976 NCAA Division II football season. The Broncos competed in the Big Sky Conference and played their home games on campus at Bronco Stadium in Boise, Idaho.

Boise State entered the season as three-time defending Big Sky champions, but under a new head coach.  After leading the Broncos for eight seasons, 61-year-old Tony Knap moved south to Nevada-Las Vegas in late January to replace Ron Meyer, who went to SMU in Dallas. Hired two weeks later in mid-February, Criner was previously the linebackers coach at UCLA under head coach Dick Vermeil; the Bruins were Pac-8 champions in 1975 and won the Rose Bowl, a 23–10 upset of undefeated and top-ranked

Schedule

References

Boise State
Boise State Broncos football seasons
Boise State Broncos football